Aniak may refer to:

 Aniak, Alaska, a city in the Bethel Census Area
 Aniak River, located in Alaska
 Aniak (crater), a small crater on Mars